Davlekanovo (Däwläkän) is a rural locality (a village) in Tangatarovsky Selsoviet, Burayevsky District, Bashkortostan, Russia. The population was 26 as of 2010. There is one street.

Geography 
Davlekanovo is located 38 km southwest of Burayevo (the district's administrative centre) by road. Novoshilikovo is the nearest rural locality.

References 

Rural localities in Burayevsky District